Perittia andoi is a moth of the family Elachistidae. It is found in Japan and the Russian Far East.

The length of the forewings is 6-6.5 mm.

References

Elachistidae
Moths described in 1982
Moths of Japan
Moths of Asia